One Drop is an international non-profit organization based in Montreal, created in 2007 by Cirque du Soleil founder Guy Laliberté, which is focused on water initiatives.

Arts and culture 
One Drop uses circus arts, folklore, popular theatre, music, dance and visual arts to raise awareness of water-related issues.

Projects 
One Drop has projects in Latin America, India, Canada and Africa.

Awards and recognition 
One Drop has received the following recognition:
 2019 Top 10 International Impact Charities as recognized by Charity Intelligence.
 "Water for Life" UN-Water Best Water Best Practices Award in the category “Best participatory, communication, awareness-raising and education practices”
 International Water Association Project Innovation Award in the Development category.

Donations 
Guy Laliberté has pledged to donate C$100 million to the organization over 25 years.

In its 2012 Annual Report, One Drop reported raising nearly $52 million over the previous five years. Funds were allocated to programs designed to provide permanent safe water to over 340,000 people.

Social Art for Behaviour Change 
The Social Art for Behaviour Change™ (SABC) approach emphasizes participation and implementing action plans that are adapted to target groups, influencers, desired behaviours and local contexts. The social art programs rely on collaboration and innovation as essential elements, which result in sustainable WASH behaviours and Social Art products created with, for, and ultimately by the communities. 
The SABC approach stands at the heart of the A·B·C for Sustainability™ model, which includes three components : Access, Behaviour Change, and Capital to drive long-term change in communities.

Poker 

In 2011, Laliberté teamed with Caesars Entertainment, owner of the World Series of Poker (WSOP), to launch a major poker tournament to benefit the organization.  The One Drop tournament would be held as a competition within the larger WSOP series of tournaments held each summer in Las Vegas.

The first tournament, known as The Big One for One Drop, was held as part of the 2012 WSOP, and had a record per person buy-in of US$1 million. The WSOP waived its normal 10% rake of the entry fees, and $111,111 of each buy-in went to the Foundation.  The 48 seats available in the event were filled, creating a poker record first prize of $18.3 million and a donation to One Drop of $5.33 million.  Caesars Interactive Entertainment CEO Mitch Garber, ineligible to play, donated $111,111 while One Drop founder Laliberté donated his entire fifth-place winnings of $1.83 million, for a total donation of $7.28 million from this single tournament game.

As part of the initial 2012 event, Caesars announced that One Drop has become an official charity of the WSOP, and it encouraged all players who cashed during any tournament at the 2012 WSOP to donate 1% of their winnings to One Drop.  Labelled the "All in for One Drop", the 2013 campaign saw 458 players contribute $0.25 million of their winnings from tournaments held during the 2013 WSOP.

References

External links
  One Drop's official website
  Cirque du Soleil One Drop's page

Cirque du Soleil
Organizations based in Montreal
Organizations established in 2007